Statistics of Armenian Premier League in the 1992 season.
Koshkagorts Yerevan had its name changed to Shengavit FC Yerevan.
Pahatsoyagorts Noyemberyan had its name changed to Aznavour FC Noyemberyan.

Teams

Regular season

Group 1

League table

Results

Group 2

League table

Results

Championship round

Championship round starting table
The qualified teams kept their head-to-head results to participate in the Championship round, resulting in the following starting table.

Championship round final table

Results

Relegation round

Relegation round starting table
The qualified teams kept their head-to-head results to participate in the Relegation round, resulting in the following starting table.

Relegation round final table

Results

Top goalscorers

See also
 1992 in Armenian football
 1992 Armenian First League
 1992 Armenian Cup

Armenian Premier League seasons
1
Armenia
Armenia